In mathematics, specifically commutative algebra, Hilbert's basis theorem says that a polynomial ring over a Noetherian ring is Noetherian.

Statement
Formally,

Hilbert's Basis Theorem. If  is a Noetherian ring, then  is a Noetherian ring.
Corollary. If  is a Noetherian ring, then  is a Noetherian ring.

This can be translated into algebraic geometry as follows: every algebraic set over a field can be described as the set of common roots of finitely many polynomial equations. Hilbert proved the theorem (for the special case of polynomial rings over a field) in the course of his proof of finite generation of rings of invariants.

Hilbert produced an innovative proof by contradiction using mathematical induction; his method does not give an algorithm to produce the finitely many basis polynomials for a given ideal: it only shows that they must exist. One can determine basis polynomials using the method of Gröbner bases.

Proof
Theorem. If  is a left (resp. right) Noetherian ring, then the polynomial ring  is also a left (resp. right) Noetherian ring.

Remark. We will give two proofs, in both only the "left" case is considered; the proof for the right case is similar.

First proof
Suppose  is a non-finitely generated left ideal. Then by recursion (using the axiom of dependent choice) there is a sequence of polynomials  such that if  is the left ideal generated by  then  is of minimal degree. It is clear that  is a non-decreasing sequence of natural numbers. Since  is Noetherian the chain of ideals

must terminate. Thus  for some integer . So in particular,

Now consider

Second proof 
Let  be a left ideal.

with degrees . Now let  be the left ideal generated by:

We have  and claim also . Suppose for the sake of contradiction this is not so.

Case 1: . Regardless of this condition, we have , so is a left linear combination

Consider

Case 2: . Then  so is a left linear combination

Considering

we yield a similar contradiction as in Case 1.

Note that the only reason we had to split into two cases was to ensure that the powers of  multiplying the factors were non-negative in the constructions.

Applications 
Let  be a Noetherian commutative ring. Hilbert's basis theorem has some immediate corollaries.

By induction we see that  will also be Noetherian. 
If  is a finitely-generated -algebra, then we know that , where  is an ideal. The basis theorem implies that  must be finitely generated, say , i.e.  is finitely presented.

Formal proofs
Formal proofs of Hilbert's basis theorem have been verified through the Mizar project (see HILBASIS file) and  Lean (see ring_theory.polynomial).

References

Further reading
 Cox, Little, and O'Shea, Ideals, Varieties, and Algorithms, Springer-Verlag, 1997.

Commutative algebra
Invariant theory
Articles containing proofs
Theorems in ring theory
David Hilbert